"Just Like Heaven" is a song by Brandon Lake, which was released as the second single from his second studio album, House of Miracles (2020), on August 14, 2020. Lake co-wrote the song with Jacob Sooter and Jeff Schneeweis. Jacob Sooter worked on the production of the single.

The song peaked at number 36 on the US Hot Christian Songs chart published by Billboard.

Background
On August 14, 2020, Lake released "Julst Like Heaaven", as the lead single to his second studio album, House of Miracles, following the release of "I Need a Ghost" in July. Lake shared the story behind the song, saying; 

Lake shared with MultiTracks that on top of the song being his personal cry for more of the presence of God, he hoped that listeners would have an encounter to get "taste of eternity."

On April 30, 2021, Lake a radio-adapted version of the song on digital platforms.

Composition

Commercial performance
"Just Like Heaven" made its debut at number 48 on Billboard's Hot Christian Songs chart dated October 10, 2020. It went on to peak at number 36 on the chart, and spent a total of eighteen non-consecutive weeks on Hot Christian Songs Chart.

Music videos
Bethel Music released the official music video of "Just Like Heaven" with Brandon Lake singing the song through their YouTube channel on August 14, 2020. On August 25, 2020, Bethel Music published the acoustic performance video of the song on YouTube. The official audio video of the song was uploaded by Bethel Music to YouTube on August 28, 2020. 

On February 17, 2021, Bethel Music released the live performance video of "Just Like Heaven" on YouTube.

Track listing

Charts

Release history

References

External links
  on PraiseCharts

2020 singles
Brandon Lake songs
Songs written by Brandon Lake